Southern Bessarabia or South Bessarabia is a territory of Bessarabia which, as a result of the Crimean War, was returned to the Moldavian Principality in 1856. As a result of the unification of the latter with Wallachia, these lands became part of United Principalities of Moldova and Wallachia.

In 1878, despite opposition from Romania, the Berlin Treaty, which followed the Russo-Turkish War (1877–1878), transferred this region back to the Russian Empire (which reintegrated it into the Bessarabia Governorate).

The transfer of the territory took place in October 1878. From 13 to 18 October, Russia took over Southern Bessarabia while the Romanian officials withdrew.

Administrative divisions
Cahul County
Bolgrad County
Ismail County

Gallery

See also
Romanian War of Independence
Administrative divisions of Moldavia
Administrative divisions of Romania

References

 Ion Nistor, Istoria Basarabiei, edit. Humanitas, București, 1991

Modern history of Romania
Bessarabia
Moldavia